All Right Here is the second studio album and third album overall from Christian singer and songwriter Sara Groves, and was released on August 20, 2002, by INO Records. The producer on the album is Nate Sabin. This release became critically acclaimed and commercially successful.

Critical reception 

All Right Here garnered critical acclaim from music critics. At Christianity Today, Russ Breimeier rated the album five stars, stating she "score[s] a home run with most every track". Mike Rimmer of Cross Rhythms rated the album nine out of ten squares, writing that the release "finds her hitting her stride." At CCM Magazine, Lizza Connor graded the album an A, highlighting that she is "still hitting repeat." Founder John DiBiase of Jesus Freak Hideout rated the album three-and-a-half stars, calling it a "strong step" that is "still a worthy acoustic pop recording and a great sophomore record for Groves." At The Phantom Tollbooth, Brian A. Smith rated the album four tocks, proclaiming it to be "an amazing work" that "will appeal to both the adult contemporary crowd, as well as the folk lovers, but also to people who just appreciate a well conceived, thoughtful album without frills." At New Release Tuesday, Kevin Davis rated the album five stars, affirming that he "highly recommend" because "She has an amazing singing voice and is easily the best female Christian songwriter." However, Ashleigh Kittle of Allmusic rated it three stars, stating that "It provides listeners with a further glimpse into the heart of Groves, offering 13 new acoustic folk-pop and at time country-flavored songs focusing on a variety of relationships."

Commercial performance 

For the Billboard charting week of September 7, 2002, All Right Here was the No. 16 most sold album in the Christian music market via the Christian Albums position. Also, it placed at No. 18 on the breaking-and-entry chart the Heatseekers Albums.

Track listing

Personnel 

 Sara Groves – lead vocals, backing vocals, acoustic piano, handclaps
 Jeff Roach – acoustic piano, keyboards
 Gary Burnette – electric guitar
 David Cleveland – acoustic guitar, electric guitar, bouzouki
 Phil Madeira – baritone guitar, slide guitar
 Nate Sabin – acoustic guitar, flute, handclaps, backing vocals
 Matt Pierson – bass guitar, fretless bass
 Steve Brewster – drums, percussion
 Marc Anderson – percussion
 Peter Ostroushko – fiddle
 Dave Jensen – trumpet
 John Catchings – strings
 Michael Olson – backing vocals
 Lori Sabin – backing vocals

Production

 Nate Sabin – producer, recording, mixing
 Troy Groves – executive producer
 Wayne Brezinka – art direction
 Dana Salcedo – art direction
 Sara Groves – illustrations
 Kristin Barlowe – photography
 Sheila Davis – hair stylist, makeup

Charts

References 

2002 albums
Sara Groves albums
INO Records albums